The  Eurocopter AS532 Cougar (now Airbus Helicopters H215M) is a twin-engine, medium-weight, multipurpose helicopter developed by France. The AS532 is a development and upgrade of the Aérospatiale SA 330 Puma in its militarized form. Its civilian counterpart is the Eurocopter AS332 Super Puma. The AS532 has been further developed as the Eurocopter EC725.

Design and development
The AS332 Super Puma, designed as a growth version to replace the SA 330 Puma, first flew in September 1977. It was fitted with two 1,330 kW Turbomeca Makila 1A1 turboshaft engines, composite rotor blades, improved landing gear and a modified tailfin.

In 1990 all military Super Puma designations were changed from "AS 332" to "AS 532 Cougar" to distinguish between the civil and military variants of the helicopter.

Canada had considered purchasing the Cougar to replace their CH-113 Labrador, but opted in the end to purchase the CH-149 Cormorant. In 2012 France began a €288.8m project (€11.1m/unit) to upgrade 23 Army Cougars and 3 for the Air Force to address obsolescence issues and to deliver similar avionics to their EC225 and EC725 helicopters.

Variants

AS532 UL/AL
The AS 532 UL/AL is the long version of the Cougar family and is powered by two Turbomeca Makila 1A1 turboshaft engines. It carries a crew of 2 and up to 29 troops or 6 injured passengers on stretchers plus 10 others. As with the other versions of the Cougar, the AS 532 UL/AL can lift 4.5 tons by means of a sling. The Horizon battlefield ground surveillance system can be installed on the AS 532 UL (utility version). The AS 532 AL (armed version) can also be fitted with a variety of weapons, including pod-mounted 20 mm cannons, 68 mm rocket-launchers, and side-mounted rapid fire machine-guns.

AS532 SC
The AS 532SC is the naval version of the Cougar family and is powered by two Turbomeca Makila 1A1 turboshaft engines. This version is mainly used for Anti-surface unit warfare (ASUW), fitted with AM 39 Exocet missiles; Anti-submarine warfare (ASW), fitted with a variable-depth sonar and torpedoes; Search and rescue; and Sea patrols. For deck landing, securing at high sea states, maneuver and traverse this variant can be fitted with ASIST.

AS535
It was variant offered to cover the Combat Search and Rescue (CSAR or RESCO in French) needs of the French Army. The military preferred to acquire the improved version of the aircraft, the Eurocopter EC725 instead to fulfill this gap.

Operators

Albanian Air Force

Brazilian Army

 Bulgarian Air Force

 Chilean Army
 Chilean Navy

 French Army

 German Air Force 

 Royal Netherlands Air Force

Royal Saudi Air Force
Royal Saudi Navy

 Slovenian Air Force

 Spanish Army

 Swiss Air Force

 Turkish Air Force
 Turkish Army

Uzbekistan Air Force

Former operator

Air Force of Zimbabwe

Accidents

 On 4 June, 1997, 11 military personnel were killed in Turkey when a Cougar helicopter was shot down with a 9K32 Strela-2 during an operation against the PKK near the Zap region, near Turkey's border with Iraq.
 On 29 April, 2003, 4 military personnel were killed when a Cougar helicopter crashed into power lines during a training flight, in Isparta Turkey.
On 25 July, 2012, a Cougar helicopter during test flight has crashed in Southeastern France in a region called Verdon Gorge. The aircraft was bordered with test pilots and engineers of the manufacturer. The tragic incident killed 6 company personnel. The aircraft crashed was destined to the Albanian Armed Forces. 
 On 1 June, 2017, 13 military personnel were killed in Turkey when a Cougar helicopter crashed into power lines shortly after take-off from a base near Turkey's border with Iraq.
 On 25 November, 2019, 13 French military personnel were killed in northern Mali when a Eurocopter Tiger helicopter collided with a Eurocopter AS532 Cougar.
On 15 April, 2020, a Cougar helicopter operated by the French Army crashed during a training exercise. The crash caused the death of 2 military personnel on board and injured other 5.
 On 4 March, 2021 a Cougar helicopter crashed during severe weather conditions in eastern Turkey, killing 11 military personnel on board and injuring two others. The victims included Lt. Gen. Osman Erbas, a highly ranked army corps commander. Nine of the victims died at the crash site, while two died of their injuries in hospital.

Specifications (AS532 UB)

See also

References

Citations

Bibliography

 Endres, Günter G. and Michael J. Gething. Jane's Aircraft Recognition Guide. HarperCollins UK, 2005. .

External links

 Airbus Helicopters AS532 ALe page
 AS 532 U2/A2 Cougar Helicopter, Search and Rescue Variant Details

Cougar
Airbus Helicopters aircraft
1970s French military utility aircraft
Military helicopters
1970s French helicopters
Twin-turbine helicopters
Aircraft first flown in 1977